Recep Öztürk (born 20 June 1977 in Tekirdağ, Turkey) is a Turkish football player. He last played as a goalkeeper for Makina Balçova Yaşamspor.

External links 
 Gençlerbirliği Site Profile
 Profile at TFF.org

1977 births
Living people
Gençlerbirliği S.K. footballers
Sakaryaspor footballers
Konyaspor footballers
Turkish footballers
TFF First League players

Association football goalkeepers